"Vuelve Junto A Mi" (English: "Come Back Next To Me") is a song performed by the Mexican singer Paulina Rubio written by Carlos Sánchez and Cesar Valle with the latter also producing the song. The song was released in March 1994 as the third single from Rubio's second studio album 24 Kilates.

Commercial performance
In the U.S., the song where it peaked at number 20 on the Billboard Hot Latin Tracks becoming her fourth song to reach the top 20. The song also reached number four in Panama.

Track listings
Mexican CD single
 "Vuelve Junto A Mí"

Credits and personnel
 Paulina Rubio - lead vocals
 C. Valle - Composer, Songwriter, Producer
 C. Sánchez-C-Sánchez - Composer, Songwriter
 Miguel Blasco - Music director, Executive producer
 Walter Tesorierie - Arrangement
 Adrian Pose - Art director
 Andrea Bronston - Backing vocalist
 Doris Cales - Backing vocalist
 José Luis - Backing vocalist

Charts

References

1994 singles
Paulina Rubio songs
Spanish-language songs
1993 songs
EMI Records singles
EMI Latin singles